Henry William Tate (4 October 1849 – 9 May 1936) was an English first-class cricketer. Tate was a right-handed batsman who bowled right-arm roundarm fast.

Career
Tate made his first-class debut for Hampshire in 1869 against the Marylebone Cricket Club, who Hampshire played twice that season.

Tate next appeared in first-class cricket for Hampshire in 1875, and between then and 1881 Tate played 26 first-class matches for the county, with the 1878 season being his most successful in terms of wickets with 20 at a bowling average of 12.65, with one five wicket haul and once taking ten wickets in a match. Tate's best first-class figures of 6-51 came in this season against Kent.

Tate appeared in a final first-class match for Hampshire in 1885 against Kent, which was the season Hampshire lost their first-class status until the 1895 County Championship.

In all Tate played 29 first-class matches for Hampshire. He scoring 499 runs at a batting average of 11.08, with a single half century score 61* against Kent. With the ball Tate took 96 wickets at a bowling average of 18.16, with six five wicket hauls and one ten wicket haul in a match.

Tate's final appearance for Hampshire in 1886 in a non first-class match against Surrey.

Umpiring career
Tate stood as an Umpire in a single first-class match in 1882 which saw Sussex play Hampshire at the County Ground, Hove.

Death
Tate died at Richmond, Surrey on 9 May 1936.

Family
Tate's brother, Frederick Tate also represented Hampshire in first-class cricket, playing four matches. In addition, he also stood as a first-class Hampshire, also in a single match which coincidentally saw Sussex play Hampshire at the County Ground, Hove in 1881.

External links
Henry Tate at Cricinfo
Henry Tate at CricketArchive
Matches and detailed statistics for Henry Tate

1849 births
1936 deaths
People from Lyndhurst, Hampshire
English cricketers
Hampshire cricketers
English cricket umpires